Kanthirava Narasimharajapura or K. N. Pura is a locality in Northern part of Mysore city. Soligara Colony and Ghousianagar are some of the prominent localities of Kanthirava Narasimharajapura. 
Indira Gandhi Road and Jilani Road are some of the major Roads of this area. K. N. Pura and Kyatamaranahalli, a nearby locality is famous for Communal clashes. This locality is sometimes referred as Kantheerava Narasarajapura.

History 
Many Labourers from different parts of the state migrated to Mysore in search of Job, following severe drought in 1980s. They settled at Kanteerava Narasimharajapura (located East of Kyathamaranahalli) since many houses were available at afforded rate. A few of them even built houses on revenue land without bothering about basic amenities like connectivity, Sewerage, education, etc.

Etymology 
The locality was named after Kanteerava Narasimharaja Wadiyar, Yuvaraja of Mysore Kingdom (1894-1940).

Education 

Srikanteshwara Vidya Samsthe is one of the popular educational institutions located in Kanthirava Narasimharajapura.

Transportation 
From the Mysore city bus stand to Kanthirava Narasimharajapura buses are available.

See also 

 Bannimantap Parade Grounds
 Naidu Nagar
 Hebbal
 Hale Kesare
 Mandi Mohalla

References 

Mysore North
Suburbs of Mysore